Derby is a former United Kingdom Parliamentary constituency. It was a constituency of the House of Commons of the Parliament of England, then of the Parliament of Great Britain from 1707 to 1800 and of the Parliament of the United Kingdom from 1801 to 1950. It was represented by two members of parliament. It was divided into the single-member constituencies of Derby North and Derby South in 1950.

History
Derby regularly sent two representatives to Parliament from Edward I's reign. In 1900 it was one of the first two constituencies to elect a member from the then newly formed Labour Party, along with Merthyr Tydfil.

In 1950 the constituency was abolished and replaced by the two single-member constituencies of Derby North and Derby South.

Boundaries
1885–1918: The existing parliamentary borough, and so much of the municipal borough of Derby as was not already included in the parliamentary borough.

Members of Parliament

1294–1640

1640–1950

Elections

Elections in the 1830s

Elections in the 1840s

 
 
 

Strutt was appointed Chief Commissioner of Railways, requiring a by-election.

 
 

Ponsonby succeeded to the peerage, becoming 5th Earl of Bessborough, causing a by-election.

 
 
 
 

The election was declared void on petition due to bribery and treating by Strutt's and Leveson-Gower's agents, and the writ suspended in March 1848, later causing a by-election.

Elections in the 1850s

 
 

 

 

Horsfall's election was in March 1853 declared void due to bribery, and Heyworth was declared elected in his place.

Elections in the 1860s

Elections in the 1870s

Elections in the 1880s 

 

Plimsoll's resignation caused a by-election.

Bass' resignation caused a by-election.

Harcourt's appointment as Chancellor of the Exchequer caused a by-election.

Elections in the 1890s 

Harcourt's appointment as Chancellor of the Exchequer requires a by-election.

Elections in the 1900s

Elections in the 1910s 

General Election 1914–15:

Another General Election was required to take place before the end of 1915. The political parties had been making preparations for an election to take place and by the July 1914, the following candidates had been selected; 
Liberal: Raymond Asquith
Labour: J. H. Thomas
Unionist: Arthur Edward Beck

Elections in the 1920s

Elections in the 1930s

Elections in the 1940s 
General Election 1939–40:

Another General Election was required to take place before the end of 1940. The political parties had been making preparations for an election to take place in Autumn 1939 and by then, the following candidates had been selected; 
Labour: Philip Noel-Baker and A E Hunter
Conservative: P C Cooper-Parry
National Labour: Archibald Church

See also
List of former United Kingdom Parliament constituencies
Unreformed House of Commons

References
Notes

References

D Brunton & D H Pennington, Members of the Long Parliament (London: George Allen & Unwin, 1954)
Cobbett's Parliamentary history of England, from the Norman Conquest in 1066 to the year 1803 (London: Thomas Hansard, 1808) 

Parliamentary constituencies in Derbyshire (historic)
Politics of Derby
Constituencies of the Parliament of the United Kingdom established in 1295
Constituencies of the Parliament of the United Kingdom disestablished in 1950